Střížov is a municipality and village in České Budějovice District in the South Bohemian Region of the Czech Republic. It has about 200 inhabitants.

Notable people
Simcha Friedman (1911–1990), Israeli rabbi

References

Villages in České Budějovice District